The L 14th Street–Canarsie Local is a rapid transit service in the B Division of the New York City Subway. Its route emblem, or "bullet", is colored  since it serves the BMT Canarsie Line.

The L operates at all times between Eighth Avenue in Chelsea, Manhattan, and Rockaway Parkway in Canarsie, Brooklyn. It also briefly enters Queens at Halsey Street, serving the neighborhood of Ridgewood. It is the first New York City Subway service to be automated using communications-based train control.

The L commenced its current route and service pattern upon completion of the Canarsie Line in 1928. Express trains formerly ran along the L trackage in central Brooklyn, running along the BMT Fulton Street Line in eastern Brooklyn, but were discontinued in 1956. Since then, the L has been entirely local.

The L was originally the Brooklyn–Manhattan Transit Corporation's 16 service. The 16 became the LL in 1967, which in turn became the L in 1985.  In the early 2000s, the L saw a dramatic increase in ridership since many neighborhoods along the route have experienced gentrification. From April 2019 to April 2020, late-night and weekend L service between Manhattan and Brooklyn was temporarily reduced as part of the 14th Street Tunnel shutdown, which sought to repair damage to the 14th Street Tunnel incurred by Hurricane Sandy in 2012.

History

Early history

1924−1967 

The L was originally given the LL designation when letters were assigned to the BMT division. From 1928 to 1967, the same service was assigned the BMT number 16.

In 1924, part of the eventual 14th Street–Canarsie Line opened, called the "14th Street–Eastern District Line" (commonly the "14th Street–Eastern Line"), and was given the number 16. This was extended east, and in 1928 it was joined to the existing BMT Canarsie Line east of Broadway Junction. Since that time, the 14th Street–Canarsie Line service has operated as it is today, except for an extension from Sixth Avenue to Eighth Avenue, which opened on May 30, 1931, to connect to the new Eighth Avenue Subway. The Eighth Avenue Terminal was originally built in IND style and has been restored to BMT style like Fulton Street and Broad Street. During rush hours, express service ran nonstop between Lorimer Street and Myrtle–Wyckoff Avenues. (Locals usually ran from Eighth Avenue to Myrtle–Wyckoff Avenues or Atlantic Avenue at these times.)

Before the 14th Street–Eastern and Canarsie Lines were connected, the Canarsie part of the line already had a number, 14, running from Lower Manhattan via the Broadway Elevated and called the Canarsie Line. When the 14th Street–Eastern Line was connected in 1928, this was renamed the Broadway (Brooklyn) Line, but continued to operate to Rockaway Parkway.

Starting on September 23, 1936, express trains ran to Lefferts Boulevard via the connection with the Fulton Street Elevated at Atlantic Avenue. This connection was severed on April 30, 1956, then the service ran to Rockaway Parkway again, but was discontinued on August 23. The R27 to R38's roll signs had both L and LL for express and local service, even though the express never ran thereafter.

1967−1985 
On November 26, 1967, with the opening of the Chrystie Street Connection, the BMT Eastern Division lines were given letters. The 14 to Canarsie was given the label  (though the 14 main line was designated , continuing east from Broadway Junction towards Jamaica). On the other hand, the 16 became the LL.  Canarsie service to Lower Manhattan was discontinued in 1968. When double letters were dropped on May 5, 1985, the LL became the L, and it still has that designation.

Skip-stop service proposal 

In 1991, skip-stop service was proposed to speed service during the height of rush hours in the peak direction which would have reduced the running time from 41 minutes to 37 minutes. Under this plan, the K designation, which was previously used as the Broadway Brooklyn Local from 1967 to 1976, and as the Eighth Avenue Local from 1985 to 1988, would be repurposed and would appear in a gray bullet similar to the color the L uses. Both services would have common stops at Rockaway Parkway, Broadway Junction (then called Eastern Parkway), Myrtle Avenue, Lorimer Street, First Avenue, Union Square, Sixth Avenue and Eighth Avenue. L trains would stop at East 105th Street, Livonia Avenue, Atlantic Avenue, Wilson Avenue, DeKalb Avenue, Morgan Avenue, Grand Street, and Bedford Avenue; K trains would stop at New Lots Avenue, Sutter Avenue, Bushwick Avenue–Aberdeen Street, Halsey Street, Jefferson Street, Montrose Avenue, Graham Avenue and Third Avenue. This change was proposed as a service improvement alongside other changes that would have either reduced or eliminated service to balance the MTA's operational budget, but was never implemented.

Modernization and rehabilitation

Ridership and CBTC 

Ridership on the L has increased dramatically since 2000 since many neighborhoods along the route have experienced gentrification. The Metropolitan Transportation Authority's $443 million fleets of subway cars on the L was introduced in 2002, but by 2006 was already too small to handle growing ridership. The Transit Authority had projected that 212 Kawasaki-made R143 subway cars would be enough to accommodate ridership demands for years to come, but ridership has risen higher than expected. Therefore, sixty-eight new R160A cars manufactured by Alstom were equipped with CBTC so they could run on the L.

The BMT Canarsie Line tracks underwent an extensive retrofit over to CBTC, a system that controls the trains via a computer onboard, as opposed manually operated by a human operator.  This was completed in early 2009. While the retrofit has resulted in nearly two years of service changes and station closings, this system will eventually allow trains to run closer together and enables in-station "countdown clock" displays to note the exact time until the next train arrives. The line also used OPTO (one person train operation) beginning in June 2005, but a combination of public outcry regarding perceived safety issues, which increased after the July 2005 London tube bombings, heavy lobbying by the Transport Workers Union of America (TWU), as well as an arbitration ruling that MTA had breached its contract with TWU caused the Metropolitan Transportation Authority to end OPTO the following September. However, the MTA's successful implementation of countdown clocks on the L was the first in the system.

On April 27, 2003, midday L service was reduced to run every 8 minutes instead of every 6 minutes.

14th Street Tunnel shutdown 

Starting April 27, 2019, L service was limited between Third Avenue and Bedford Avenue on late nights and weekends to allow for repairs on the Canarsie Line tunnels under the East River, which were badly damaged by Hurricane Sandy in 2012. Trains in both directions operated on one tube between Third and Bedford Avenues while late night and weekend work was done on the other tube. The original plan was for a full 15-month closure with both tubes closed simultaneously west of Bedford Avenue, but the plans were revised in January 2019. On April 26, 2020, New York governor Andrew Cuomo announced the completion of the project, months ahead of schedule.

Route

Service pattern
The L uses the following lines with the same service pattern at all times.

Stations 
The L runs on the BMT Canarsie Line in its entirety.

Notes

References

External links 
 
 MTA NYC Transit – L 14th Street – Canarsie Local
 
 

New York City Subway services